Jacqueline Wing Ying Siu  (born 8 December 1982 in Hong Kong) is a dressage rider from Hong Kong. She became the first equestrian athlete from Hong Kong who won a gold medal during the 2018 Asian Games in Jakarta.

Biography
Jacqueline Siu was born in Hong Kong, where she started riding at the age of five at the Beas River Hong Kong Jockey Club. At the age of 10, she moved to the United Kingdom with her family. In England, she continued her riding career at pony, junior and young rider level were she internationally competes for Great Britain, including European youth championships. In 2005 she decided to compete under the Hong Kong flag. Jackie began competing on senior level and moved to The Netherlands to train with triple Olympic champion Anky van Grunsven.

Jackie competed at four Asian Games in Doha 2006, Guangzhou 2010, Incheon 2014 and 2018 Asian Games in Jakarta, Indonesia. In 2018 she also competed at the World Equestrian Games in Tryon.

She is currently running her own stable Pebbly Hill Stud in Cotswold, England.

Horses
 Ferrera - 2003 Bay Oldenburger mare (Sandro Hit x Donnerhall)
 Jockey Club Furst on Tour - 2005 Darkbay Rheinlander gelding (Furst Henrich x Rubioso)
 Jockey Club Connery - 2001 Bay Danish Warmblood stallion (Come Back II x Port Royal)

Awards
Jacqueline Siu is awarded a Medal of Honour at the 2019 Hong Kong Awards Ceremony.

References

External links
Official website
FEI Biography

Living people
1982 births
Hong Kong dressage riders
Hong Kong female equestrians
Asian Games gold medalists for Hong Kong
Asian Games medalists in equestrian
Equestrians at the 2006 Asian Games
Equestrians at the 2010 Asian Games
Equestrians at the 2014 Asian Games
Equestrians at the 2018 Asian Games
Medalists at the 2018 Asian Games
Hong Kong emigrants to the United Kingdom